Ante Vidošević (2 October 1925 – 23 August 1975) was a Croatian footballer who played as a defender and made one appearance for the Croatia national team.

Career
Vidošević earned his first and only cap for Croatia in the team's 1956 friendly match against Indonesia. The fixture, which was played on 12 September in Zagreb, finished as a 5–2 win for Croatia. It was however unofficial since Croatia was part of SFR Yugoslavia.

Personal life
Vidošević died on 23 August 1975 in Zagreb at the age of 49.

Career statistics

International

References

External links
 

1925 births
1975 deaths
People from Sinj
Association football defenders
Yugoslav footballers
Croatian footballers
Croatia international footballers
RNK Split players
NK Zagreb players
Yugoslav First League players